Mammea is a flowering plant genus with about 70 species in the family Calophyllaceae. Its members are evergreen trees having edible fruits. The flowers are polygamous, with a unitary calyx opening into two or three valvate sepals. There are 4 to 8 petals. Berries are formed, containing 1 to 4 seeds. The leaves are rigid, coriaceous and often have pellucid dots.

Species

A least two species are found in tropical America and the West Indies (Mammea americana and M. immansueta), about 20 species, including M. africana and M. usambarensis in mainland Africa and many in Madagascar, with the remainder in Indomalaya and the Pacific region.  Plants of the World Online currently includes:

 Mammea acuminata (Kosterm.) Kosterm.
 Mammea africana Sabine – African mammee apple
 Mammea americana L.
 Mammea anastomosans (Miq.) Kosterm.
 Mammea angustifolia Planch. & Triana
 Mammea aruana Kosterm.
 Mammea bongo (R.Vig. & Humbert) Kosterm.
 Mammea brevipetiolata Kosterm.
 Mammea calciphila Kosterm.
 Mammea calophylloides Kosterm.
 Mammea cauliflora (Baker) P.F.Stevens
 Mammea congregata (Boerl.) Kosterm.
 Mammea cordata P.F.Stevens
 Mammea eugenioides Planch. & Triana
 Mammea glauca (Merr.) Kosterm.
 Mammea glaucifolia (H.Perrier) Kosterm.
 Mammea grandifolia P.F.Stevens
 Mammea harmandii (Pierre) Kosterm.
 Mammea immansueta D'Arcy
 Mammea lancilimba Kosterm.
 Mammea malayana Kosterm.
 Mammea megaphylla (J.-F.Leroy) P.F.Stevens
 Mammea micrantha (Pierre) Kosterm.
 Mammea nervosa (Kurz) Kosterm.
 Mammea neurophylla (Schltr.) Kosterm.
 Mammea novoguineensis (Kaneh. & Hatus.) Kosterm.
 Mammea odorata (Raf.) Kosterm.
 Mammea papuana (Lauterb.) Kosterm.
 Mammea papyracea P.F.Stevens
 Mammea pseudoprotorhus (H.Perrier) P.F.Stevens
 Mammea punctata (H.Perrier) P.F.Stevens
 Mammea ramiflora (Merr.) Kosterm.
 Mammea reticulata Kosterm.
 Mammea sanguinea (Jum. & H.Perrier) Kosterm.
 Mammea sessiliflora Planch. & Triana
 Mammea siamensis (Miq.) T.Anderson
 Mammea sinclairii Kosterm.
 Mammea suriga (Buch.-Ham. ex Roxb.) Kosterm.
 Mammea timorensis Kosterm.
 Mammea touriga (C.T.White & W.D.Francis) L.S.Sm.
 Mammea usambarensis Verdc.
 Mammea veimauriensis P.F.Stevens
 Mammea woodii Kosterm.
 Mammea yunnanensis (H.L.Li) Kosterm.
 Mammea zeereae P.F.Stevens

Synonymy
Synonyms of this genus are:
Ochrocarpos Noronha ex Thouars
Paramammea J.-F.Leroy

References

External links
Mammea siamensis 

Fruits originating in Africa
 
Malpighiales genera